HMS Whitehall, pennant number D94, later I94, was a Modified W-class destroyer of the British Royal Navy that saw service in the Second World War.

Construction and commissioning 

Whitehall, the first Royal Navy ship of the name, was ordered in January 1918 as part of the 13th Order of the 1918–1919 Naval Programme. She was laid down in June 1918 by Swan Hunter at Wallsend, Newcastle upon Tyne, and launched on 11 September 1919. Work was then suspended and she was towed to Chatham Dockyard, where her fitting-out finally was completed in July 1924. She was commissioned into service on 9 July 1924 with the pennant number D94.

Service history

Before the Second World War 
After entering service with the fleet in 1924, Whitehall saw limited operational use before being decommissioned for economic reasons, transferred to the Reserve Fleet, and placed in reserve.

In August 1939, Whitehall was recommissioned with a reserve crew for the Royal Review of the Reserve Fleet in Weymouth Bay by King George VI. She then remained in commission as the fleet mobilised because of deteriorating diplomatic relations between the United Kingdom and Nazi Germany, and received orders to proceed to Rosyth, Scotland, in the event of war and report for duty there with the 15th Destroyer Flotilla.

Second World War

1939 
After the United Kingdom entered the Second World War on 3 September 1939, Whitehall took aboard stores and her wartime complement and proceeded to Rosyth for her assignment with the 15th Destroyer Flotilla. Upon arrival, she took up convoy escort and patrol duties in the North Sea, which she continued through November 1939. In December 1939 she was transferred to Western Approaches Command for convoy defence operations in the Southwestern Approaches.

1940 
In January 1940, Whitehall proceeded to Gibraltar where on 21 January she set out for the United Kingdom as the escort for Liverpool-bound Convoy HG 16F along with Vanoc and the destroyer , reinforced the following day by the sloop . The three destroyers detached from the convoy on 28 January and returned to base in the United Kingdom. On 5 May 1940, Whitehall, the sloop , and two French warships joined Convoy OG 28 as it formed in the Southwestern Approaches for its passage to Gibraltar; she and Rochester detached from the convoy later in the day to return to base. Whitehalls pennant number was changed to I94 during May 1940.

The highly successful German invasion of France, Luxembourg, Belgium, and the Netherlands began on 10 May 1940, and on 20 May Whitehall was assigned to the support of operations ashore as Allied forces retreated before the German offensive and required evacuation to the United Kingdom. On 26 May, she was assigned to Operation Dynamo, the evacuation of Allied troops from Dunkirk, France. She made two evacuation trips on 30 May, carrying 655 troops from Dunkirk to Dover on the first voyage and another 593 on the second. On 31 May, she joined Winchelsea and the destroyer  in an evacuation run to Dunkirk and carried another 943 troops to Dover. On 1 June, after German aircraft sank the destroyer  in shallow water at La Panne, Belgium, Whitehall joined the fishing trawler Jolie Mascotte in rescuing 131 members of Basilisks crew, destroyed the wreck of Basilisk with gunfire, and then, after suffering damage in a German air attack, landed 571 personnel – a mix of evacuated troops and Basilisk survivors – at Dover, bringing to 2,762 the number of personnel she evacuated during Dynamo. The ship was depicted in the Dover scene of the 1958 movie 'Dunkirk', starring John Mills.

After Dynamo, Whitehall was under repair at Plymouth until 26 August 1940. With her repairs complete, she transferred to Harwich to conduct patrols and convoy defence operations in the North Sea. In September 1940, she was transferred to Western Approaches Command for convoy escort duties in the Western Approaches as a part of the 8th Escort Group based at Liverpool.

Whitehall continued on convoy escort duty in the North Atlantic for the rest of 1940 without major incident.

1941 
After spending the first half of 1941 on North Atlantic convoy duty without any significant incidents, Whitehall was selected in June 1941 to carry out trials of a new weapon, the Five Wide Virgins, a mortar designed by John I. Thornycroft & Company to fire depth charges ahead of a ship attacking an enemy submarine. Whitehall conducted the trials during July 1941, and the weapon was unsuccessful, although a later antisubmarine mortar designed by the Admiralty, Hedgehog, would become an important Allied antisubmarine weapon.

After completion of the antisubmarine mortar trials, Whitehall returned to North Atlantic convoy duty. On 9 August she escorted the military convoy WS 8C from the Clyde to Scapa Flow as part of the build-up for a planned occupation of the Azores that later was cancelled, returning to the Clyde on 10 August. She joined Witch and the Royal Netherlands Navy light cruiser  in escorting Convoy WS 10X from Liverpool to the Clyde on 15 August 1941.

From 1 to 4 October 1941, Whitehall, Witch, the light cruiser , and the destroyer  escorted military convoy WS 12 during its passage of the Northwestern Approaches, detaching along with the other escorts to return to the Clyde.

1942 

Whitehall remained on North Atlantic convoy duty until February 1942, when she was transferred to the Mediterranean. She arrived at Gibraltar on 27 February to take part in Operation Spotter I, an aircraft delivery run to Malta that was cancelled due to aircraft fuel problems. On 20 March, Whitehall, Active, Anthony, Blankney, Croome, Duncan, Exmoor, Laforey, and Wishart again departed Gibraltar as escort for Argus and Eagle as the two carriers again delivered aircraft to Malta in Operation Picket I. On 27 March, the same ships began Operation Picket II to deliver aircraft to Malta yet again.

In April 1942, Whitehall returned to the United Kingdom to rejoin her escort group, and was selected for conversion into a Long-Range Escort. In May 1942, she entered the Royal Navy Dockyard at Sheerness to undergo a refit and begin the conversion, which included the installation of a Type 271 surface warning radar and a Type 286P air warning radar. After the completion of her post-conversion acceptance trials and pre-deployment work-ups, she rejoined her escort group in August 1942. On 30 September 1942, she was detached from the group to escort the 1st Minelaying Squadron while it laid mines in the Northern Barrage, and in October 1942 she transferred to the 2nd Escort Group to continue North Atlantic convoy defence operations. In November 1942, Whitehall returned to the United Kingdom as part of the escort for a convoy making the reverse trip.

During 1942, Whitehall was "adopted" by the civil community of Cheltenham, Gloucestershire, in a Warship Week national savings campaign.

1943

Atlantic Convoys 
Whitehall continued on Atlantic convoy duty without major incident until April 1943, when she joined Hesperus, Vanessa, corvettes of her escort group, and the 5th Support Group – consisting of the escort aircraft carrier  and four destroyers – in escorting Convoy ONS 4. The convoy came under attack by German submarines of Wolfpack Meise. In May 1943, Whitehall, Hesperus, and ships of the 2nd Escort Group were among eight escorts of the 25-ship Convoy SC 129, which came under attack by 21 German submarines of Wolfpack Elbe on 11 May. Hesperus damaged  and sank  on 11–12 May, while Whitehall pursued two radio direction-finding contacts on the afternoon of 12 May, attacking one submarine with depth charges and another with gunfire and depth charges without sinking them. German attacks ceased on 13 May after Biter arrived to provide air cover.

In October 1943, Whitehall participated in Operation Alacrity, the establishment of air and refuelling bases in the Azores, escorting convoys carrying men, equipment, and supplies to the islands. Later in the month, she returned to convoy escort duty, taking part in the escort of the combined convoys MKS 28 and SL 138.

Arctic Convoys 
In November 1943, Whitehall was reassigned to the escort of Arctic convoys between the United Kingdom and the Soviet Union. On 15 November, Whitehall, the destroyer , the corvette , and the minesweeper  set out from Loch Ewe, Scotland, as the escort of Convoy JW 54A during its passage to the Kola Inlet in North Russia, where it arrived without incident on 24 November. She and the same ships escorted Convoy RA 54B from the Kola Inlet to Loch Ewe between 27 November and 9 December 1943 in another uneventful passage. Heavy units of the Home Fleet sank Scharnhorst in the Battle of the North Cape on 26 December 1943, and JW 55B arrived at the Kola Inlet on 30 December without losing any ships. On 31 December, Whitehall, Wrestler, Honeysuckle, Oxlip, and the corvette  departed the Kola Inlet as the escort for Convoy RA 55B.

1944 

Although German submarines of Wolfpack Eisenbart detected Convoy RA 55B and attacked it in early January 1944, all of their attacks were ineffective, and Whitehall and her fellow escorts delivered the convoys eight merchant ships to Loch Ewe without loss on 8 January 1944.

On 22 January 1944, Whitehall, Oxlip, the destroyer , the sloop , and the minesweeper  departed Loch Ewe escorting Convoy JW 56B to the Soviet Union. Whitehall detached from the convoy upon arrival at the Kola Inlet on 1 February 1944.

After arriving at Loch Ewe, Whitehall was reassigned to North Atlantic convoy defence, but in March 1944 she once again was selected for Arctic convoy work. The escort later was reinforced by two escort aircraft carriers, the light cruiser , and destroyers of the Home Fleet, and aircraft from the escort carrier  and surface ships combined to sink four German submarines after they began attempts to attack the convoy on 29 March. JW 58 arrived at the Kola Inlet on 4 April 1944.

On 20 April 1944, Whitehall got underway for the Kola Inlet to take aboard Soviet Navy personnel slated to man warships in the United Kingdom scheduled for transfer to the Soviet Union and to escort empty Allied ships to the United Kingdom. During the passage, she was part of a force of 15 destroyers and Royal Canadian Navy frigates screening Activity, Diadem, and the escort aircraft carrier . The ships arrived at the Kola Inlet on 23 April, and Whitehall embarked 14 passengers before the force got underway again as the escort for Convoy RA 59 on 28 April.

Upon arrival in the United Kingdom, Whitehall was reassigned to North Atlantic convoy duty, but later in May 1944 was selected to participate in Operation Neptune, the assault phase of the upcoming Allied invasion of Normandy, scheduled for early June 1944. The escort group escorted Convoy EBC 1, made up of preloaded stores coasters, from Milford Haven to the Isle of Wight on 3 June, then to the Solent on 5 June. On 7 June, the second day of the invasion, EBC 1 and its escort group proceeded to the invasion beaches. On 9 June, Whitehalls escort group was back at Milford Haven, and then began a cycle of escorting convoys carrying reinforcements and supplies to the beachheads until released from Operation Neptune on 27 June 1944.

Upon her release from Neptune, Whitehall was assigned to another tour escorting Arctic convoys. The passage was marred by the loss of the sloop , which sank in one minute on 21 August after suffering two torpedo hits, but the convoy arrived at the Kola Inlet on 24 August. On 28 August, Whitehall, Keppel, Loch Dunvegan, and the sloops  and  departed the Kola Inlet as the close escort for Convoy RA 59A; on 30 August, Whitehall rescued the survivors of the American merchant ship SS William S. Thayer, which the German submarine  had sunk. Whitehall detached from the convoy upon its arrival at Loch Ewe without the loss of a single merchant ship on 5 September 1944.

From 15 to 23 September 1944, Whitehall, Cygnet, Keppel, the destroyer , and the corvettes  and  escorted Convoy JW 60 from the United Kingdom to the Kola Inlet without interference by German forces. The same ships escorted Convoy RA 60 on its voyage from the Kola Inlet to Loch Ewe between 28 September and 5 October 1944, losing two merchant ships to German submarine attack on 29 September.

Whitehall was transferred to North Atlantic convoy defence operations on 7 October 1944. She carried out these duties through the end of 1944 and into early 1945 without major incident.

1945 

After beginning 1945 on North Atlantic convoy duty, Whitehall was selected later in January 1945 to return to the Arctic convoy run. On 2 February 1945, she got underway from the Clyde with Bamborough Castle, Bluebell, Cygnet, Rhododendron, the sloop , and the corvette  as the close escort for Convoy JW 64. She and Lark repelled a torpedo attack by German aircraft on 10 February, and the convoy arrived at the Kola Inlet on 15 February. On 16 February, Whitehall took part in antisubmarine operations off the Kola Inlet to clear the way for the next departing convoy, Convoy RA 64, then joined the same ships that had escorted JW 64 to escort RA 64 to the United Kingdom.  The convoy departed the Kola Inlet on 17 February, and that morning a German acoustic torpedo badly damaged Lark and forced her to return under tow to the Kola Inlet, but the other ships pressed on for the United Kingdom. Whitehall was forced to leave the convoy on 21 February because of boiler problems and proceed independently.

After the completion of repairs in March 1945, Whitehall was assigned to escort duty in the waters around Great Britain, which she continued until the surrender of Germany in early May 1945.

Decommissioning and disposal 

Whitehall was decommissioned and placed in reserve in May 1945, and by July 1945 she no longer appeared on the Royal Navys active list. Placed on the disposal list after the 15 August 1945 surrender of Japan, she was sold in October 1945 to the British Iron & Steel Corporation (BISCO), which allocated her for scrapping to Thos. W. Ward. She arrived at Wards yard at Barrow-in-Furness on 27 October 1945.

Notes

Bibliography

External links 

 

V and W-class destroyers of the Royal Navy
1919 ships
Ships built on the River Tyne
Ships built in Chatham
World War II destroyers of the United Kingdom
Ships built by Swan Hunter